Islands Brygge station (lit. Icelandic Quays) is a rapid transit station of the Copenhagen Metro in Copenhagen, Denmark. The first station on the M1 Line after its split from the M2 Line at Christianshavn, it is located in zone 1 in the northwestern section of the island of Amager.

Location
Islands Brygge station is situated in the rapidly evolving Islands Brygge area in the very northern part of the Ørestad redevelopment area, termed Ørestad Nord. Specifically, the station lies below Ørestads Boulevard at its intersection with Njalsgade. Nearby is Havneparken, a celebrated public park transformed from a former industrial site in 1984 with additions since then.

Transit-oriented development
As one of six stations within or bounding the Ørestad redevelopment area, Islands Brygge has witnessed significant transit-oriented development. Mostly educational in nature, nearby is the University of Copenhagen's Faculty of Humanities. Commercial development in the area includes Metropolitain, a  office and shopping complex was opened in 2010.

Station layout
Like all Copenhagen Metro stations, Islands Brygge has an island platform setup with two tracks.

References

External links
Islands Brygge station on www.m.dk 
Islands Brygge station on www.m.dk 

M1 (Copenhagen Metro) stations
Railway stations opened in 2002
2002 establishments in Denmark
Railway stations in Denmark opened in the 21st century